Colonel Alexander Campbell of Possil (see Carter-Campbell of Possil) (1754–1849) entered the army as an ensign in the 42nd Regiment in April 1769, and obtained a lieutenancy in the 2nd Battalion Royals the following year in Menorca.

Military career
He moved to the 62nd regiment later that year in Ireland and went with the regiment to Canada, where, as a captain of light infantry under General Carleton, he fought in the campaigns of 1776 and 1777 with General Burgoyne in the American War of Independence.

After the surrender of Saratoga, he was sent to New York, with the rank of major, and was appointed to the 1st Battalion of Light Infantry. He received the lieutenant-colonelcy of the 62nd Regiment in 1782. Soon afterwards, he returned to Scotland, where he remained with his regiment until 1789. He served with the Duke of York and Albany in the 1790s and was given the rank of colonel on 1 October 1793. He raised the 116th Regiment in 1794 and was their first brigadier-general. He was sent to the West Indies under Sir Ralph Abercromby and on 10 November 1796 was appointed colonel of the 7th West India Regiment.

He returned to Scotland at the end of the 1790s and was placed on the Staff in Ireland and Scotland for five years. On 11 July 1804, he was appointed colonel of the 19th Foot and served during the battles in South Africa, being present at the capture of the Cape of Good Hope in 1806.  He was also present at the battle of Corunna, where he commanded the 20th Regiment and subsequently became general on 1 January 1812 and colonel of the 32nd Foot in February 1813.

Slave holder
According to the Legacies of British Slave-Ownership at the University College London, Campbell was awarded compensation in the aftermath of the Slavery Abolition Act 1833 with the Slave Compensation Act 1837.

Campbell was associated with "T71/880 Grenada claim no. 704 (Mount Rose)", he owned 232 slaves in Grenada and received a £6,113 payment at the time (worth £ in ).

Land ownership
In 1808, he acquired the estates of Possil in Lanarkshire from his father John Campbell, founder of the West Indian trading house of John Campbell Sr. of Glasgow, and subsequently the estates of Torosay and Achnacroish on the Isle of Mull, Argyllshire.

In the 1830s "Alexander Campbell of Possil" is noted as residing at 12 Abercromby Place in the Second New Town in Edinburgh, overlooking Queen Street Gardens.

See also

 Torosay Castle
 Possil Estate (Possil Park today)
 Duart Castle
 Clan Campbell
 Clan Maclachlan
 Clan Lamont
 Henry Raeburn

References

External links
 REPORTS FROM THE SELECT COMMITTEE ON SITES FOR CHURCHES(SCOTLAND), Correspondence with the Free Church. 1847.
 Sir Henry Raeburn oil painting reproductions
 Hotels; Bed & Breakfasts; Links/Maps; Send United States, hotelslines.com
 Military Forces
 The old country houses of the old Glasgow gentry: LXXXIII. Possil
 James Irvine-Robertson's Journal from 1845–1847 (Mull Diaries), jamesirvinerobertson.co.uk
 The Island & Its People. By Jo Currie (pages 197, 225, 238, 256, 281, 310–312, 319, 326, 331, 332, 333, 366, 372, 384, 403)., books.google.com
 The Glasgow Story, John Campbell of John Campbell Snr & Co.

Scottish Episcopalians
1754 births
1849 deaths
British Army personnel of the Napoleonic Wars
Bedfordshire and Hertfordshire Regiment officers
British Army personnel of the American Revolutionary War
Alexander
Wiltshire Regiment officers
42nd Regiment of Foot officers
18th-century Scottish landowners
People from North Lanarkshire
People from Argyll and Bute
Scottish slave owners
Recipients of payments from the Slavery Abolition Act 1833
19th-century Scottish landowners